Alypiodes bimaculata, the two-spotted forester, is a species of moth in the family Noctuidae (the owlet moths). The species was first described by Gottlieb August Wilhelm Herrich-Schäffer in 1853. It is found in North America.

The MONA or Hodges number for Alypiodes bimaculata is 9312.

References

Further reading

 
 
 

Agaristinae
Articles created by Qbugbot
Moths described in 1853